Didier Ndama Bapupa (born 30 June 1972) is a former footballer who played for DR Congo at the 1998 Africa Cup of Nations.

Notes

References

Living people
1972 births
Footballers from Kinshasa
Democratic Republic of the Congo footballers
Democratic Republic of the Congo international footballers
Association football defenders
Daring Club Motema Pembe players
K.V. Oostende players
Cercle Brugge K.S.V. players
Belgian Pro League players
1998 African Cup of Nations players
Democratic Republic of the Congo expatriate footballers
Expatriate footballers in Belgium
Democratic Republic of the Congo expatriate sportspeople in Belgium